Sierra Leone competed at the 1984 Summer Olympics in Los Angeles, United States.

Results by event

Athletics
Women's 100 metres
 Eugenia Osho-Williams
 First Heat — 12.83s (→ did not advance)

Boxing
Men's Light Middleweight (– 71 kg)
 Israel Cole 
 First Round – Bye
 Second Round – Defeated Victor Claudio (PUR), RSC-1
 Third Round – Defeated Elone Lutui (TNG), RSCH-2
 Quarterfinals – Lost to Christophe Tiozzo (FRA), 0:5
Men's Heavyweight (– 91 kg)
 Egerton Forster 
 First Round – Bye
 Second Round – Lost to Arnold Vanderlyde (NED), 1:4

References
Official Olympic Reports

Nations at the 1984 Summer Olympics
1984
Oly